Brad Gilbert was the defending champion, but he lost in first round.

Jimmy Connors won the tournament, beating Gilad Bloom in the final, 2–6, 6–2, 6–1.

Seeds

Draw

Finals

Top half

Bottom half

References

 Main Draw

Singles